The Warrawoona Group is a geological unit in Western Australia containing putative fossils of cyanobacteria cells. Dated 3.465 Ga, these microstructures, found in Archean chert, are considered to be the oldest known geological record of life on Earth.

Description 
The fossils in this group were discovered by Arthur Hugh Hickman in 1983 in Warrawoona, a region on the Pilbara craton in the northern part of Pilbara province.

Whether or not the fossils were authentic was disputed in the past, as abiotic processes could not be ruled out. Currently the fossils are thought to be of biological origin, however there is no conclusive evidence of fossilized organisms in the formation, and whether the lines in the rock are fossilized stromatolites.

The rocks also include felsic volcanic rocks.

See also 
 North Pole, WA for similar issues
 Origin of life
 Timetable of the Precambrian
 Geology of Australia
 Fig Tree Formation

References

Further reading

External links 
 Geological Society of Australia

Geologic groups of Oceania
Geologic formations of Australia
Geology of Western Australia
Archean
Precambrian Australia
Pilbara
Origin of life